Rudnik pri Radomljah is a dispersed settlement of isolated small farms on the hills above Volčji Potok in the Municipality of Kamnik in the Upper Carniola region of Slovenia.

Name
Rudnik pri Radomljah was attested in written sources as Ruͤdnik in 1359. The name of the settlement was changed from Rudnik to Rudnik pri Radomljah (literally, 'Rudnik near Radomlje') in 1955.

References

External links

Rudnik pri Radomljah on Geopedia

Populated places in the Municipality of Kamnik